John Coldale or Cowdale (by 1495 – 1534 or later), of Carlisle, Cumberland, was an English politician.

He was a Member (MP) of the Parliament of England for Carlisle in 1529.

References

15th-century births
16th-century deaths
Politicians from Carlisle, Cumbria
English MPs 1529–1536